Melvin Leroy Harder (October 15, 1909 – October 20, 2002), nicknamed "Chief", was an American right-handed starting pitcher, coach and manager in Major League Baseball, who played his entire career with the Cleveland Indians. He spent 36 seasons overall with the Indians, as a player from 1928 to 1947 and as one of the game's most highly regarded pitching coaches from 1948 to 1963. He set franchise records for wins (223), games started (433) and innings pitched (3426) which were later broken by Bob Feller, and still holds the club record of 582 career games pitched; he was among the American League's career leaders in wins (9th), games (8th) and starts (10th) when he retired. He was also an excellent fielder, leading AL pitchers in putouts four times, then a record.

Career
Harder was born in Beemer, Nebraska, and graduated from Tech High School in North Omaha, Nebraska. His pitching style revolved around his fine curveball, a hard fastball and excellent control. He joined the starting rotation in 1930, and posted a record of 39–37 from 1930 to 1932; on July 31, he pitched the first game ever at Cleveland Municipal Stadium. In  he finished second in the AL with an earned run average of 2.95, trailing teammate Monte Pearson (2.33); under modern rules (one inning pitched per games played by team), enacted in 1951, Harder would have been credited with the league lead, as Pearson only pitched 135 innings. In  he finished with 20 wins, led the league with six shutouts, and was again second in ERA (2.61) to Lefty Gómez. In  he was second to Wes Ferrell in wins (22) and innings (287), and was fifth in the AL with a 3.29 ERA.

Harder was one of the most successful All-Stars of the 1930s, appearing in all four games from 1934 to 1937, and setting a record with 13 consecutive innings without an earned run. He won the 1934 All-Star game after relieving Red Ruffing with none out and two men on in the fifth inning, with an 8–6 lead; one run scored on a double steal, but Harder allowed only one hit in his five innings as the AL won 9–7.

In 1940, he posted a 12–11 record, as the Indians finished one game behind the pennant-winning Detroit Tigers, wasting an early September lead amid clubhouse rancor; it would be the only season in his career in which the Indians came within ten games of the AL flag. In addition to his 223 victories, his 186 losses remain a club record. Ironically, the Indians won the World Series the year after he retired.

From 1948 into the 1950s, he guided what became known as the Indians' "Big Four" pitching rotation, featuring Feller, Bob Lemon, Early Wynn and Mike Garcia; Harder had successfully transformed Lemon from an infielder into a top pitcher while working with him in the mid-1940s, and he taught future 300 game-winner Wynn the breaking ball and changeup. Wynn had had a losing record (72-87) before being traded to the Indians by the Washington Senators. In 1953, Lemon tied Harder's record by leading AL pitchers in putouts for the fourth time, and he broke the record the following year as the Indians won another pennant, but lost to the underdog New York Giants in the World Series. Herb Score was named the AL's Rookie of the Year in  after Harder helped to develop his curveball. When Sal Maglie was struggling with the Indians, Harder watched some films of Maglie pitching with the Giants and figured out that he wasn't swivelling his foot like he normally did, which kept him from following through with his delivery. "As soon as I went back to the old way, everything was all right," Maglie said. Late in his tenure, prominent young pitchers as Sam McDowell, Tommy John and Luis Tiant would come under his guidance. He was fired after the 1963 season, having spent the first 36 years of his adult life in Cleveland.

He later coached with the New York Mets (1964), Chicago Cubs (1965), Cincinnati Reds (1966–68) and Kansas City Royals (1969).

Cleveland retired his number 18 on July 28, 1990 (he wore 43 and 2 as a coach), and he was named one of the Indians' top 100 players in 2001.

In 2002, Harder died in Chardon, Ohio at age 93; at the time of his death, he had been one of only five living players who had played in the 1920s.

Legacy

Harder was the only pitcher to work 10 or more All-Star innings without allowing an earned run and the only man in major league history to have both 20-year playing and coaching careers. Only Harder, Walter Johnson and Ted Lyons pitched more seasons with one club. He was the only man to play 20 seasons for one franchise who is not an active player, in the Hall of Fame, or on the Hall of Fame ballot. He threw the first pitch ever thrown at Cleveland Municipal Stadium in a 1932 game, and the last pitch there, as well, in ceremonies after the final game of the 1993 season before the Indians moved to Jacobs Field. He holds the record for the most managerial wins (three) without a loss.

Joe DiMaggio recalled that he had more difficulty batting against Harder than against just about any other pitcher. Hank Greenberg also named him one of the five toughest pitchers he faced in his career.

See also
List of Major League Baseball retired numbers
List of Major League Baseball career wins leaders
List of Major League Baseball annual ERA leaders
List of Major League Baseball players who spent their entire career with one franchise

References

External links

1909 births
2002 deaths
American League All-Stars
American League ERA champions
American sportsmen
Baseball players from Nebraska
Chicago Cubs coaches
Cincinnati Reds coaches
Cleveland Indians coaches
Cleveland Indians managers
Cleveland Indians players
Dubuque Dubs players
Kansas City Royals coaches
Major League Baseball pitchers
Major League Baseball pitching coaches
Major League Baseball players with retired numbers
New Orleans Pelicans (baseball) players
New York Mets coaches
Omaha Buffaloes players
People from Cuming County, Nebraska